Wilkowice  is a village in Bielsko County, Silesian Voivodeship, in southern Poland. It is the seat of the gmina (administrative district) called Gmina Wilkowice. The village has a population of 6,496.

It is one of the oldest villages in Żywiec Basin. It was established in the early 14th century by the Cistercian monastery in Rudy, which owned the area alongside Łodygowice and Pietrzykowice.

Turist attractions 
The main attraction of the village are the tourist mountain trails running to the top of Magurka and Rogacz. Other natural assets include rocks and mountain streams. Among the Monuments of Wilkowice it is worth mentioning:

 Saint Michael Church from 1900
 Parish cemetery
 Epidemic cemetery from 1847
 Old railway station from 19th century
 Hospital from 19th century
 Old mill by the river Biała

Gallery

References

Villages in Bielsko County
Kingdom of Galicia and Lodomeria
Kraków Voivodeship (1919–1939)